Liam Madden (born 1983/1984) is an American Marine veteran, entrepreneur, and anti-war activist. Although a political independent, he was the Republican nominee in the 2022 United States House of Representatives election in Vermont. A critic of the two-party system, he stated that if elected, he would not caucus with House Republicans.

Madden served in the United States Marine Corps from 2003 to 2007. Shortly before leaving the military, he founded Appeal for Redress, a group of military personnel opposed to the Iraq War. He then served as a leader of Iraq Veterans Against the War, including chair of the board of directors.

Early life
In 1989, when he was four years old, Madden's family moved to Stowe, Vermont. In 1996, Madden they moved to Bellows Falls, Vermont.

Military service
Madden served in the Marine Corps Communications Electronics Specialist from January 2003 to January 2007 and attained the rank of Sergeant. During this time, he deployed to Kuwait, Thailand, Okinawa, Japan, and Korea, and spent seven months in Iraq.

After the end of his term of service, but while still a member of the Individual Ready Reserve, Madden was investigated by the Marines for his anti-war activities.  He was charged with making disloyal statements and with wearing his uniform at a political event, and he was threatened with having his honorable discharge status revised to "Other Than Honorable", which would prevent him from receiving benefits. The Marine Corps dropped its case.

Anti-war activism

Appeal for Redress
While still in the military, Madden worked with sailor Jonathan Wesley Hutto to write and begin circulation of the Appeal for Redress, taking advantage of a legal right for U.S. military personnel to petition their Congressional representatives.  The Appeal, which had been signed by over 2000 active-duty military personnel as of January, 2008, states:

As a patriotic American proud to serve the nation in uniform, I respectfully urge my political leaders in Congress to support the prompt withdrawal of all American military forces and bases from Iraq. Staying in Iraq will not work and is not worth the price. It is time for U.S. troops to come home.

The Appeal attracted media coverage from 60 Minutes, NPR, the New York Times, the Washington Post, Los Angeles Times, the San Francisco Chronicle, The Nation, and the Army Times, among others.

Madden's leadership and activism against the Iraq war was praised by Vermont's U.S. senator Patrick Leahy:

Sgt. Madden is an American patriot. I wish officials in the White House and the Pentagon who got us into this fiasco had a fraction of his honesty and courage.

Business career
Madden was co-founder of Green Gas Movement, a greentech start-up that won the 2018 MIT Solve contest. He currently works as Director of Solar Energy at a Vermont based home energy company.

2022 U.S. House of Representatives campaign

Madden, an Independent and critic of the two-party system, ran in the Republican primary. His victory was considered an upset.

The Vermont Republican Party state committee disavowed Madden's campaign following a meeting with him on August 15, less than a week after his victory in the primary, citing his refusal to commit to caucusing with the Republican Party if he won the election. He would ultimately lose the general election to Becca Balint.

Political positions

Democracy reform
Madden is a critic of the two-party system and regards "fixing the government" his "top priority". To achieve a more democractic, accountable and responsive government he proposes the introduction of term limits, ranked choice voting, and national ballot initiatives. Madden calls for public funding of electoral campaigns, stating that "[w]inning an election under the current system requires hundreds of thousands of dollars. This excludes most working class people from participating, and gives inherent advantage to the kinds of representatives with access to, and perhaps disproportionate sympathies for the economically elite." He also advocates for using technology to "bypass politicians" as much as possible and create a direct democracy.

Economy and finance
Madden supports raising taxes for billionaires and large corporations to "invest this revenue into regenerative agriculture, sustainable infrastructure, healthcare, family leave, and education." He proposes the introduction of a wealth tax: "Taxing wealth and not simply income is the only way to prevent the accelerating concentration of power that threatens democracy." While sympathizing with the idea of Universal Basic Income (UBI) as put forth by Andrew Yang, Madden favors "universal public services": "Much of the same benefits of a UBI can be acheived via a federal work gaurantee [sic], federally funded (and locally controlled) health clinics, federal funding for 0% home loans and public transportation." Madden calls for the creation of a large "public service corps" to guarantee employment and "to build needed public infrastructure like public transportation, housing, education, healthcare, and regenerative agricultural resources". He supports worker cooperatives: "I would like to see a massive tax incentive, and other public subsidies for businesses offering meaningful avenues for employee ownership. And disincentives for companies that offer no such pathways." Madden is a proponent of the Modern Monetary Theory.

Infrastructure
Madden favors public transportation and wants it to be the "backbone of our infrastructure and transportation needs." He calls for "a trillion-dollar public transportation infrastructure and smart development, meaning creating housing and business land use patterns that are inherently more efficient."

Awards
In 2007 Madden received the Institute for Policy Studies' Letelier-Moffitt Human Rights Award.

Personal life
Madden lives in Bellows Falls with his wife Lauren and their two children.

See also

Adam Kokesh, Marine who faced a similar discharge hearing

References

External links
 Campaign website

1980s births
American anti–Iraq War activists
American anti-war activists
Candidates in the 2022 United States House of Representatives elections
Living people
United States Marine Corps personnel of the Iraq War
United States Marines
People from Bellows Falls, Vermont
Northeastern University alumni
Vermont Independents
Year of birth missing (living people)